Run Norwich is an annual road running event over 10 kilometres (6.2 miles) held in Norwich, United Kingdom. Established in 2015 by Norwich City Community Sports Foundation, the race goes through Norwich's city centre, and passes landmarks such as Carrow Road, Norwich Cathedral, and Norwich Castle.

In 2019, over 6,200 participants started the race, with Logan Smith and Iona Lake of City of Norwich Athletics Club claiming victories in 31:41 and 36:23 respectively.

Following a three-year hiatus due to the COVID-19 pandemic in Europe, Run Norwich returned to the city on Sunday 23rd October 2022, attracting over 6,200 participants.

Past winners

References

External links 
 Official website

Athletics competitions in England

Annual sporting events in the United Kingdom
10K runs
Road running in the United Kingdom
Recurring sporting events established in 2015
2015 establishments in England